FASTWEB S.p.A. is an Italian telecommunications company that provides fixed and mobile telephony, broadband Internet and IPTV services. Fastweb is also one of the prominent companies in Italy providing FTTH connections. Fastweb is fully owned by the Swiss telecommunication company Swisscom AG.

In May 2007, Swisscom paid 3 billion euros for 82.4% of Fastweb. Swisscom subsequently bought out the minority shareholders after making a voluntary tender offer in September 2010. Therefore, Fastweb has been delisted from Borsa Italiana.

Network and services
By implementing the internet protocol on its alternative fiber-optic network, Fastweb provides a Triple-Play Offer of landline, internet and television services, available simultaneously on a single connection, for residential and business clients. Today Fastweb's fiber-optic network is the most extended in Europe.

In September 2010 and for the first time in Italy, Fastweb launched a broadband connection up to 100 Mbit/s for residential customers and small enterprises in the cities of Milan, Rome, Genoa, Turin, Bologna, Naples and Bari.

In September 2008, Fastweb became also a mobile virtual network operator (MVNO) and launched its mobile voice and data service (Quadruple Play).

In July 2019 becomes the fifth mobile network operator in Italy by obtaining the license to operate on 5G network.

Today, business customers account for 60% of the total revenue. On the government market, Fastweb became the main supplier of fixed network telephone and data services to central public agencies.

Founding and early history 
Fastweb was founded in 1999 in Milan by Silvio Scaglia, Francesco Micheli, and Ruggero Gramatica. e.Biscom was founded with the intention of developing a fiber-optic network in Italy, and Fastweb was launched as a joint venture with AEM to develop IP services.

In March 2000, e.Biscom went public on the Italian New Market Stock Exchange to expand and finance their fiber-optic network in major Italian cities. e.Biscom soon became the first operator in the world to use full IP technology and bring fiber-optic networks to cities, and launched home telecommunication services. In 2002, fiber-optic cabling was completed in Milan, and Fastweb consolidated its presence in Rome, Genoa, Turin, Naples, and Bologna.

e.Biscom merger 
e.Biscom announced a possible merger with Fastweb in early 2004, and the merger was finalized by the end of April. The company took on Fastweb's name, and focused on its core business, creating broadband telecommunications on the Italian landline network.

Expansion and technological achievements 
By 2006, Fastweb's broadband network had expanded to cover about 45 percent of Italy's population, and later that year, Fastweb won both a Consip and a Centro Nazionale per l'Informatica nella Pubblica Amministrazione (CNIPA) tender for the Public Connectivity System (SPC) becoming a supplier to relevant public authorities.

Swisscom acquisition 
By 2006, Fastweb was Italy's leading alternative broadband telecommunications provider, boasting over one million customers and an annual revenue of €1.26 billion. In early 2007, Fastweb was bought by Swisscom, a major Swiss telecommunications provider, to strengthen new technologies and multimedia for Swisscom, while increasing cash flow and revenue.

Expansion under Swisscom 
In 2008, Fastweb launched connections of up to 100 Mbit/s for small and medium enterprises in areas served by its fiber-optic network, making this connectivity speed available in Italy for the first time. Over the next year, Fastweb signed an agreement with Telecom Italia to promote the development of fiber-optic next-generation networks (NGN) by sharing infrastructure.

Fastweb worked to continue expanding faster service, and in 2010, their Fibra 100 service became available to residential consumers, and two million homes and businesses had the ability to use the Internet at 100 Mbit/s for the first time in Italy.

In 2015, Fastweb signed an agreement with Telecom Italia to become a full mobile virtual network operator (Full MVNO) to ensure better quality and coverage, including access to 4G and 4G+.

After continuing to grow, in 2018 Fastweb acquired Tiscali's fixed-wireless business, including full ownership of Tiscali's 5G, 3.5 GHz spectrum, in a deal worth approximately $176 million.

See also
 List of VoIP companies

Other sources

References

External links
 

Italian brands
VoIP companies of Italy
Streaming television
Internet service providers of Italy
Companies based in Milan
Companies formerly listed on the Borsa Italiana